Werpe is a locality in the municipality Schmallenberg in the district Hochsauerlandkreis in North Rhine-Westphalia, Germany.

The Werpe has 203 inhabitants and lies in the west of the municipality of Schmallenberg at a height of around 430 m. The river Wehrsiepen flows through the village.

Werpe borders on the villages of Harbecke, Felbecke, Wormbach, Schmallenberg and Fleckenberg. Schmallenberg's aerodrome (Motorsport- und Segelflugplatz Rennefeld) is between the villages of Werpe and Wormbach. In the village centre the Landesstraße 737 meets the Kreisstraße 25.

Werpe was first mentioned in 1221 in a document. The village used to belong to the municipality of Wormbach in Amt Schmallenberg until the end of 1974.

Gallery

References

Villages in North Rhine-Westphalia
Schmallenberg